"Come Together" is a song by the English rock band the Beatles, written by John Lennon and credited to Lennon–McCartney. The song is the opening track on their 1969 album Abbey Road and was also released as a single coupled with "Something". The song reached the top of the charts in the United States and Australia, but peaked at No. 4 in the United Kingdom.

It has been covered by several other artists, including Ike & Tina Turner, Aerosmith and Michael Jackson.

Background and inspiration 

In early 1969, John Lennon and his wife, Yoko Ono, held nonviolent protests against the Vietnam War, dubbed the Bed-ins for Peace. In May, during the Montreal portion of the bed-in, counterculture figures from across North America visited Lennon, including American psychologist Timothy Leary, an early advocate of LSD, whom Lennon admired. Leary intended to run for Governor of California in the following year's election and asked Lennon to write him a campaign song based on the campaign's slogan, "Come Together – Join the Party!" The resulting chant was only a line long: "Come together and join the party". Lennon promised to finish and record the song, and Leary later recalled Lennon giving him a tape of the piece, but the two did not interact again.

In July 1969, during sessions for the Beatles' album Abbey Road, Lennon used the phrase "come together" from the Leary campaign song to compose a new song for the album. Based on the 1956 single "You Can't Catch Me" by American guitarist Chuck Berry, the composition began as an up-tempo blues number, only slightly altering Berry's original lyric of "Here come a flattop / He was movin' up with me" to "Here come ol' flattop / He come groovin' up slowly". Lennon further incorporated the phrase "shoot me" from his unfinished and unreleased January 1969 song, "Watching Rainbows". The lyrics were inspired by his relationship with Ono, and were delivered quickly, as in the Berry song. Author Peter Doggett wrote that "each phrase [passes] too quickly to be understood at first hearing, the sound as important as the meaning".

When Lennon presented the composition to his bandmates, his songwriting partner Paul McCartney noticed its similarity to "You Can't Catch Me" and recommended they slow it in tempo to reduce the resemblance.

Beatles historian Jonathan Gould has suggested that the song has only a single "pariah-like protagonist" and Lennon was "painting another sardonic self-portrait".

In a December 1987 interview by Selina Scott on the television show West 57th Street, George Harrison stated that he wrote two lines of the song.

Production

Recording 
The Beatles taped the basic track for "Come Together" at EMI Studios (now Abbey Road Studios) in Studio Three on 21 July 1969, during the sessions for Abbey Road. George Martin produced the session, assisted by balance engineers Geoff Emerick and Phil McDonald. At McCartney's request, the session marked Emerick's first with the group since July 1968, having quit working with them during sessions for their 1968 album, The Beatles (also known as "the White Album"), due to what he found a tense and negative atmosphere. The session also marked Lennon's first new composition for the band in three months, having last recorded "The Ballad of John and Yoko" on 14 April.

The group taped eight takes of "Come Together", with take six marked "best". The line-up consisted of Lennon singing lead vocal, McCartney on bass, George Harrison on rhythm guitar and Ringo Starr on drums. Starr placed tea towels over his tom drums to further dampen their sound. Without needing to use his hands to play guitar, Lennon added handclaps each time he sang "Shoot me!", also adding tambourine over both the solo and coda. Taped on 4-track recording equipment, at the end of the session, take six was copied over to 8-track tape in Studio Two, allowing for both overdubbing and the easy manipulation of EQ.

Overdubbing and mixing 

Overdubbing for "Come Together" took place in the week following the recording of the basic track. On 22 July, Lennon sang a new lead vocal and again added handclaps, both being treated to a tape delay, with automatic double tracking added during the choruses. At Lennon's request, McCartney played a Fender Rhodes electric piano, with McCartney later recalling that Lennon "wanted a piano lick to be very swampy and smokey, and I played it that way and he liked that a lot". Harrison added a heavily distorted guitar during the refrains, while Starr added a maraca. Work on the track continued the next day, with more vocals added. On 25 July, McCartney contributed a harmony vocal sung below Lennon's part, and on 29 July, Lennon overdubbed a guitar during the song's middle climax. Work on the song finished the next day, with Harrison playing a lead guitar solo with a Gibson Les Paul during the song's coda.

Mixing on "Come Together" was completed on 7 August in Studio Two. Done on EMI's new solid state mixing console, the EMI TG12345, Emerick later suggested that the console's "softer and rounder" sonic texture influenced the band's performances, with "the rhythm tracks... coming back off tape a little less forcefully", the overdubs were subsequently "performed with less attitude". He also suggests that, because McCartney's bass hits on the "me" of Lennon's line "Shoot me!", only "Shoot" is easily audible on the finished recording. Ten stereo mixes were made during the process, with the first attempt marked "best". Like the rest of Abbey Road, the song was never mixed for mono.

Release and legacy
Apple Records, the Beatles' EMI-distributed record label, released Abbey Road on 26 September 1969, with "Come Together" sequenced as the opening track. The song was issued as a double A-side single with Harrison's "Something" on 6 October in America (as Apple 2654) and 31 October in Britain (as Apple R5814). Commercially, the single was a massive success, staying on the US Billboard Hot 100 chart for 16 weeks, and reaching No. 1. The single was released on 31 October 1969 in the UK and reached No. 4.

The first take of the song, recorded on 21 July 1969, with slightly different lyrics, was released in 1996 on the outtake compilation Anthology 3, and take five of the song was released on the Abbey Road 50th Anniversary release.

In May 2021, Ringo Starr said it was his favourite Beatles song in an interview on The Late Show with Stephen Colbert.

Accolades
"Come Together" has frequently appeared on numerous publications' lists of the Beatles' best songs. In 2006, Mojo magazine placed it at No. 13 in their list of the Beatles' 101 best songs. Four years later, Rolling Stone ranked it No. 9 on their list of the band's 100 greatest songs. Meanwhile, Entertainment Weekly and Ultimate Classic Rock ranked it at No. 44 and No. 20, respectively. In 2015, NME and Paste placed it at No. 20 and No. 23 in their respective lists of the band's best songs.

Rolling Stone ranked "Come Together" at No. 202 on their list of the 500 Greatest Songs of All Time in 2004, re-ranking it No. 205 in the 2010 revised list. Based on the song's appearances in professional rankings and listings, the aggregate website Acclaimed Music lists "Come Together" as the 16th most acclaimed song of 1969, the 113th most acclaimed song of the 1960s and the 393rd most acclaimed song in history.

Lawsuit

In late 1969, "Come Together" was the subject of a copyright infringement claim brought against Lennon by Big Seven Music, the publisher of Chuck Berry's "You Can't Catch Me". Morris Levy, the owner of Big Seven Music, contended that it sounded similar musically to Berry's original and shared some lyrics (Lennon sang: "Here come ol' flattop, he come groovin' up slowly", and Berry's had sung: "Here come a flattop, he was movin' up with me"). Before recording, Lennon and McCartney deliberately slowed the song down and added a heavy bass riff in order to make the song more original. The case was settled out of court in 1973, with Levy's lawyers agreeing that Lennon would compensate by recording three Big Seven songs for his next album. A brief version of "Ya Ya" with Lennon and his son Julian was released on the album Walls and Bridges in 1974. "You Can't Catch Me" and another version of "Ya Ya" were released on Lennon's 1975 album Rock 'n' Roll, but the third, "Angel Baby", remained unreleased until after Lennon's death. Levy again sued Lennon for breach of contract, and was eventually awarded $6,795. Lennon countersued after Levy released an album of Lennon material using tapes that were in his possession and was eventually awarded $84,912.96. The album was called Roots: John Lennon Sings the Great Rock & Roll Hits.

Personnel 
According to Kevin Howlett:
 John Lennon – lead and backing vocals, guitar, handclaps, tambourine
 Paul McCartney – backing vocal, bass, electric piano
 George Harrison – lead and rhythm guitars
 Ringo Starr – drums, maraca

Charts

Weekly charts

Year-end charts

Certifications and sales

Cover versions

Ike & Tina Turner version

A month after the original version by the Beatles was released, Ike & Tina Turner began performing their rendition of "Come Together," most notably at Madison Square Garden in November 1969. Due to the public response to their live performances, a studio version was released on Minit Records in December 1969. The single, also credited to the Ikettes, reached number 57 on the Billboard Hot 100 and number 21 on the Billboard R&B Singles chart. The B-side features another soul-infused rock cover, "Honky Tonk Women" by the Rolling Stones.

"Come Together" is the lead single from Ike & Tina Turner's 1970 album Come Together. The song has been released on various compilations, including Greatest Hits (1976), Proud Mary: The Best of Ike & Tina Turner (1991), and The Ike & Tina Turner Story: 1960–1975 (2007). A live version was recorded at L'Olympia in Paris on 30 January 1971, and released later that year on their live album Live in Paris.

John Lennon solo version
"Come Together" was the only Beatles song Lennon sang during his 1972 Madison Square Garden concerts. It was Lennon's only full-length concert performance after leaving the Beatles. He was backed by the band Elephant's Memory. This version of the song appears on the concert album Live in New York City, recorded on 30 August 1972 and released in 1986.

Aerosmith version

American hard rock band Aerosmith recorded one of the most successful cover versions of "Come Together" in 1978. The band performed the song in the 1978 film Sgt. Pepper's Lonely Hearts Club Band; their recording appeared on its accompanying soundtrack album. Released as a single in July 1978, Aerosmith's version was an immediate success, reaching number 23 on the Billboard Hot 100, following on the heels of a string of Top 40 hits for the band in the mid-1970s. However, it would be the last Top 40 hit for the band for nearly a decade.

Another recording of the song was released several months later on Aerosmith's live album Live! Bootleg. The song also featured on Aerosmith's Greatest Hits, the band's first singles compilation released in 1980. Their live performance from the 33rd Annual Grammy Awards ceremony was released in a Grammy compilation CD. The song has also surfaced on a number of Aerosmith compilations and live albums since then, as well as on the soundtrack for the film Armageddon.

Gary Clark Jr. and Junkie XL version

American musician Gary Clark Jr. and Dutch composer Junkie XL released a cover version of "Come Together" as the first single from the soundtrack of the 2017 superhero film Justice League on 8 September. A music video featuring Gary Clark Jr. on guitar and vocals interspersed with cuts of footage from the film was released on 27 October. The single reached No. 27 on the Billboard Digital Songs Sales and No. 7 on the Billboard Hot Rock & Alternative Songs.

Weekly charts

Other versions
McCartney recorded an updated version of "Come Together" with Noel Gallagher and Paul Weller for the 1995 charity album Help, under the name the Smokin' Mojo Filters. Weller performed the lead vocal duties, with McCartney and Gallagher providing backing vocals, harmonies and bass and guitar. Their rendition reached No. 19 on the UK Singles Chart in December 1995.

Michael Jackson also covered the song in 1986. The song was recorded for Bad (1987), but was scrapped and instead put on HIStory: Past, Present and Future, Book I (1995). It was also included as a B-side on Jackson's "Remember the Time" CD single. It was featured at the end of the 1988 film Moonwalker and also had an official video. Notably, it was the only Beatles song covered by Jackson on an official release. Jackson had purchased the publishing rights to the Beatles' catalogue in 1985 and thus owned the rights to "Come Together" at the time he covered the song.

Arctic Monkeys covered the song for the 2012 Summer Olympics opening ceremony, it was released on the album Isles of Wonder and reached No. 21 on the UK Singles Chart.

Foo Fighters, Liam Gallagher and Aerosmith's Joe Perry covered "Come Together" at the CalJam Festival in San Bernardino, California in 2017. Gallagher forgot the words during the performance, later explaining that he thought they were performing "I Am the Walrus".

See also
Come Together: A Night for John Lennon's Words and Music

Notes

References

Citations

Sources

External links

 
 Full lyrics for the song at the Beatles' official website
 Lyrics and video of Come Together
 The 15 Best Come Together Covers

1969 songs
1969 singles
1978 singles
Aerosmith songs
All-star recordings
Apple Records singles
Billboard Hot 100 number-one singles
British blues rock songs
Cashbox number-one singles
Charity singles
Columbia Records singles
Decca Records singles
Diana Ross songs
Domino Recording Company singles
Epic Records singles
Eurythmics songs
Go! Discs singles
Ike & Tina Turner songs
Joe Cocker songs
Liberty Records singles
Marilyn Manson (band) songs
Michael Jackson songs
Minit Records singles
Number-one singles in Australia
Number-one singles in Germany
Songs involved in plagiarism controversies
Songs published by Northern Songs
Song recordings produced by George Martin
Song recordings produced by Ike Turner
Songs written by Lennon–McCartney
Soundgarden songs
The Beatles songs
The Ikettes songs
The Supremes songs
Tom Jones (singer) songs
Warner Records singles
WaterTower Music singles
Timothy Leary